The following is a list of presidents of the entertainment division for the American Broadcasting Company (ABC).  Prior to the mid 1970s, the role was essentially filled under the title Vice President of Programs.

References

See also
List of programs broadcast by American Broadcasting Company

 
 
ABC